A toymaker is someone who makes toys.

Toymaker may also refer to:

 Celestial Toymaker, a fictional extraterrestrial in Doctor Who
 Toymaker (The Batman), a fictional C.E.O. in The Batman

See also

 The Toymaker